The Cal State Monterey Bay Otters (or CSUMB Otters) are the athletic teams that represent California State University, Monterey Bay, located in Monterey County, California, in intercollegiate sports as a member of the Division II level of the National Collegiate Athletic Association (NCAA), primarily competing in the California Collegiate Athletic Association (CCAA) for most of its sports since the 2004–05 academic year; while its women's water polo teams compete in the Western Water Polo Association (WWPA). The Otters previously competed in the California Pacific Conference (CalPac) of the National Association of Intercollegiate Athletics (NAIA) from 1996–97 to 2003–04.

Facilities
The Otter Sports Center is the home to the Otters Men's and Women's Basketball and Women's Volleyball teams. The gymnasium inside the Otter Sports Center is affectionately known as The Kelp Bed, in reference the floating home of the sea otter.

History

The CSUMB Otters began intercollegiate competition in 1996, with all sports competing in the National Association of Intercollegiate Athletics (NAIA) as part of the California Pacific Conference. In 2003, the Otters made the transition to the NCAA Division II ranks, joining the CCAA as a provisional member in 2004. After two years of probationary status, the Otters became full-fledged members of the NCAA and the CCAA in 2005. In their first five years of competition the Otters earned four conference titles and one national championship in Men's Golf (2011).

Conference affiliations
 1996–97 to 2002–03 – California Pacific Conference – NAIA
 2003–04 – California Pacific Conference – NAIA; Division II Independent – NCAA
 2004–05 to present – California Collegiate Athletic Association – NCAA

Varsity teams
CSUMB competes in 14 intercollegiate varsity sports: Men's sports include baseball, basketball, cross country, golf and soccer; while women's sports include basketball, cross country, golf, soccer, softball, track & field (indoor and outdoor), volleyball and water polo.

CSUMB also has a coed sailing team which competes in the fall and spring (although the spring season is more important). The sailing team competes in the Pacific Coast Collegiate Sailing Conference (PCCSC).

Championships

Appearances
The CSU Monterey Bay Otters competed in the NCAA Tournament across 5 sports (2 men's and 3 women's) 22 times at the Division II level.

 Baseball (4): 2013, 2016, 2018, 2019
 Women's basketball (3): 2011, 2012, 2013
 Men's golf (7): 2010, 2011, 2013, 2014, 2015, 2017, 2019
 Women's golf (1): 2010
 Softball (7): 2008, 2009, 2010, 2012, 2014, 2015, 2017

Team
The Otters of CSU Monterey Bay earned 1 NCAA team championship at the Division II Level.

 Men's (1)
 Golf: 2011

Results

Below are two national club team championships:

 Women's disc golf (2): 2015, 2016 (NCDGU)

References

External links
 

 
1996 establishments in California
Sports clubs established in 1996